Sahitya Akademi Award is given each year, since 1955, by Sahitya Akademi (India's National Academy of Letters), to Indian writers for their outstanding books of literary merit published in any of the 24 major Indian languages. The list of Malayalam language writers who have won the award is given below.

Winners 

Note: No awards in 1959, 1961, and 1968.

References

Malayalam-related lists
 
Malayalam
Malayalam literary awards
Lists of people from Kerala